Andrew Michael Sullivan (born 19 May 1987) is an English professional golfer who currently plays on the European Tour.

Amateur career
Sullivan had a successful amateur career before turning professional. He won the individual title in the Tailhade Cup in Argentina in 2010, and won the 2011 New South Wales Medal in Australia. Sullivan's biggest win as an amateur came at the 2011 Scottish Amateur Stroke Play Championship.

In 2011, Sullivan represented the winning Great Britain and Ireland team at the 2011 Walker Cup, where he lost 3&2 to Jordan Spieth in the singles.

Professional career
Sullivan turned professional in 2011; in that year he played four European Tour events before entering the 2011 qualifying school where he obtained the tour card with a 3rd-place finish.

In 2012, Sullivan finished in 145th place in the Race to Dubai without a top-10 finish. He secured his place on the European Tour for 2013 at the 2012 qualifying school.

In 2013, Sullivan finished 98th on the Race to Dubai with his best finish being a tie for third at the Alfred Dunhill Championship.

In 2014, Sullivan finished 33rd on the Race to Dubai including a second-place finishing at the Trophée Hassan II, a third place at the KLM Open, and three more top-10 placements. During that season, Sullivan hit a hole-in-one at the KLM Open earning him a flight into space.

Sullivan's first European Tour win came in January 2015 at the South African Open. Sullivan won the event in a playoff against South African Charl Schwartzel who had started the final round seven strokes ahead of Sullivan. Sullivan quickly followed this success with wins at the 2015 Joburg Open in March and the Portugal Masters in October, which was a wire-to-wire victory by nine strokes. He became the first man to record three victories on the European Tour in 2015, finishing with an 8th place in the final Order of Merit . In February 2016, he advanced to a career best 28th in the Official World Golf Ranking.

Thanks to his results on the 2015 and 2016 seasons of the European Tour he obtained an automatic selection for the 2016 Ryder Cup.

In August 2020, Sullivan secured his first victory in five years at the English Championship, a new event created as part of a UK Swing after the European Tour reorganised the 2020 season due to the COVID-19 pandemic. His score of 257 over 72 holes was at the time the lowest score in a European Tour tournament on European soil, beating the previous best of 258, shared by David Llewellyn in 1988 and Ian Woosnam in 1990.

Amateur wins
 2010 individual title in the Tailhade Cup
 2011 New South Wales Medal, Scottish Amateur Stroke Play Championship

Professional wins (4)

European Tour wins (4)

1Co-sanctioned by the Sunshine Tour

European Tour playoff record (1–0)

Sunshine Tour wins (2)

1Co-sanctioned by the European Tour

Sunshine Tour playoff record (1–0)

Results in major championships
Results not in chronological order in 2020.

 

CUT = missed the half-way cut
"T" = tied
NT = No tournament due to COVID-19 pandemic

Summary

Most consecutive cuts made – 5 (2016 U.S. Open – 2017 Open Championship)
Longest streak of top-10s – 0

Results in The Players Championship

CUT = missed the halfway cut

Results in World Golf Championships

1Cancelled due to COVID-19 pandemic

NT = No tournament
"T" = Tied

Team appearances
Amateur
Walker Cup (representing Great Britain and Ireland): 2011 (winners)
European Amateur Team Championship (representing England): 2011

Professional
EurAsia Cup (representing Europe): 2016 (winners)
Ryder Cup (representing Europe): 2016
World Cup (representing England): 2016

See also
2011 European Tour Qualifying School graduates
2012 European Tour Qualifying School graduates

References

External links

English male golfers
European Tour golfers
Ryder Cup competitors for Europe
Sportspeople from Nuneaton
1987 births
Living people